Diana Izbeth Fierro Delgado (born 19 June 1995) is a Mexican professional football midfielder who currently plays for América of the Liga MX Femenil.

See also
 List of people from Morelos, Mexico

References

External links 
 

1995 births
Living people
Mexican women's footballers
Footballers from Morelos
Sportspeople from Cuernavaca
Liga MX Femenil players
Women's association football midfielders
Mexican footballers